Hrun is the name of:

 Apidej Sit Hrun
 Hrun the Barbarian